Four-time defending champion Shingo Kunieda defeated Stéphane Houdet in the final, 6–0, 6–3 to win the men's singles wheelchair tennis title at the 2011 Australian Open. It was his fifth Australian Open singles title and twelfth major singles title overall.

Seeds
 Shingo Kunieda (champion)
 Stéphane Houdet (final)

Draw

Finals

External links
 Main Draw

Wheelchair Men's Singles
2011 Men's Singles